Croatian may refer to:

Croatia
Croatian language
Croatian people
Croatians (demonym)

See also
 
 
 Croatan (disambiguation)
 Croatia (disambiguation)
 Croatoan (disambiguation)
 Hrvatski (disambiguation)
 Hrvatsko (disambiguation)
 Serbo-Croatian (disambiguation)

Language and nationality disambiguation pages